The Bank of Baghdad (ISX: BBOB) is one of the largest commercial banks in Iraq. It was established in 1992.

Bank of Baghdad is a member of KIPCO group and enjoys international banking partnerships throughout the Middle East, North Africa, and further afield to Europe, United States of America, United Kingdom, and China which allows us to provide better regional banking services through sister banks in Kuwait, Bahrain, Jordan, Syria, Algeria and Tunis. Other financial services in the network for Investment and Asset Management are; United Gulf Bank Securities Company (UGBS), Bahrain, United Gulf Financial Services (UGFS), Qatar, KAMCO, Kuwait, Al Dhiyafa, Kuwait, Royal Capital, Abu Dhabi, UAE, North Africa Holding Company, Kuwait, and Manafae Investment Company, Kuwait.
Commercial banking activities including deposits and loans; Financing activities including trade, industrial, agricultural and housing loans; investment services including real estate investment portfolios and security trading; life and non-life insurance services.

The Bank of Baghdad opened its first branch in Beirut, Lebanon.

See also

Economy of Iraq
Central Bank of Iraq

References

External links
 Official Website
 Official Iraq Stock Exchange homepage
 IraqiXchange - Iraqi Market Research

Companies based in Baghdad
Banks of Iraq
1992 establishments in Iraq
Banks established in 1992
Iraqi companies established in 1992
Companies listed on the Iraq Stock Exchange